The Bleed the Sky is a four-track EP by the California based metalcore band Bleed the Sky. The album was released in 2003 and was produced by Thom Hazaert and engineered and mixed by Ben Schigel at Spider Studios in Strongsville, Ohio.

Track listing
 "Killtank" - 3:49
 "Leverage" - 4:06
 "From Shotguns To Halos" - 4:09
 "Through The Dirt" - 4:29

2004 EPs
Bleed the Sky (band) albums